Patricia McCormack (born Patricia Ellen Russo in 1945) is an American actress with a career in theater, films, and television.

McCormack began her career as a child actress. She is perhaps best known for her performance as Rhoda Penmark in Maxwell Anderson's 1956 psychological drama The Bad Seed. She received critical acclaim for the role on Broadway and was nominated for an Oscar for Best Supporting Actress for her performance in Mervyn LeRoy's film adaptation.  Her acting career has continued with both starring and supporting roles in film and television, including Helen Keller in the original Playhouse 90 production of The Miracle Worker, Jeffrey Tambor's wife Anne Brookes on the ABC sitcom The Ropers, and as Pat Nixon in Frost/Nixon (2008).

She also appeared in the November 11, 1982, season 3 episode 8..."Foiled Again" of Magnum, P.I. with Tom Selleck. She was also cast and appeared as Adriana La Cerva's mother in The Sopranos.

Life and career
 
McCormack was a child model at the age of four, and began appearing on television at the age of seven. She made her motion-picture debut in Two Gals and a Guy (1951) and appeared as Ingeborg in the television series Mama with Peggy Wood from 1953 to 1956. Her Broadway debut was in Touchstone (1953), and the following year, she originated the role of Rhoda Penmark, an eight-year-old psychopath and fledgling serial killer, in the original stage version of Maxwell Anderson's The Bad Seed (1954) with Nancy Kelly. She was nominated for an Academy Award for Best Supporting Actress for her role in the film version (1956). She portrayed Helen Keller in the original 1957 Playhouse 90 production of William Gibson's The Miracle Worker opposite Teresa Wright.

In 1957, she was cast by Orson Welles in his film adaptation of Don Quixote, but filming had to be abandoned for budgetary reasons, and was never fully completed. When a version was edited together in 1992, some years after Welles's death, it did not include any of McCormack's scenes, though they had been central to the framing of the plot. In 1959 she was in an episode of One Step Beyond called "Make Me Not a Witch". She had the role of a pampered child star in the 1958 comedy Kathy O' and recorded the title song for Dot Records. McCormack briefly starred in her own series, Peck's Bad Girl, with Marsha Hunt and Wendell Corey in 1959, and had a leading role in MGM's remake of The Adventures of Huckleberry Finn with Eddie Hodges. In the early 1960s, she starred in a series of popular teenage delinquent films, including The Explosive Generation with William Shatner and The Young Runaways. In 1962, she portrayed Julie Cannon in the Rawhide episode "Episode of the Wolves"; she appeared on the show again the following year, playing Sarah Higgins in the episode "Incident at Paradise".

She married restaurateur Bob Catania in 1967, and the couple had two children before their marriage was dissolved. After a half-dozen teen roles during the 1960s, her film career gradually declined, but she continued to work in television. In 1970, she played Linda Warren on the soap opera The Best of Everything. She guest-starred on The Streets of San Francisco, season two, episode "Blockade". She also portrayed a San Francisco paramedic on the season-seven Emergency! series episodes "What's a Nice Girl Like You Doing...?" and "The Convention". She resumed her cinema career with Bug in 1975.

McCormack held several recurring roles in popular television series, including Dallas, Murder, She Wrote, and The Sopranos. McCormack also starred as Anne Brookes, the wife of Jeffrey P. Brookes III (played by Jeffrey Tambor) on the ABC television series The Ropers, a spin-off of Three's Company starring Norman Fell and Audra Lindley, from 1979 to 1980. When Kathryn Hays left the CBS soap opera As the World Turns for an extended period, McCormack took Hays' role until she returned. She starred as a psychotic mother in the cult thriller Mommy and its 1997 sequel Mommy 2: Mommy's Day. In 2008, McCormack played First Lady Pat Nixon in the feature film Frost/Nixon. McCormack continues to work regularly and she costarred in the 2012 series Have You Met Miss Jones?. A recent film appearance is in the 2014 release Chicanery and she guest-starred in a 2013 episode of the series Hart of Dixie. Her most notable recent work was in the Paul Thomas Anderson film  The Master.

In April 2018, it was announced that McCormack would join the cast of General Hospital temporarily replacing Leslie Charleson in the role of Monica Quartermaine due to injuries Charleson sustained in a fall. In September 2018, McCormack portrayed Dr. March, the child psychiatrist consulted in the 2018 television remake of The Bad Seed.

Awards
McCormack was nominated for an Academy Award for Best Supporting Actress and a Golden Globe for Best Supporting Actress for The Bad Seed. On March 20, 1956, she received the Milky Way "Gold Star Award" as the most outstanding juvenile performer, in which Sal Mineo was placed third and Tommy Rettig second.

Her star on the Hollywood Walk of Fame is at 6312 Hollywood Boulevard. She received the star in 1960 aged 15, making her the youngest honoree on the Walk.

McCormack was a guest for the 2009 Mid-Atlantic Nostalgia Convention, where her films were screened, and she received an award during the closing ceremonies.

Selected filmography

Two Gals and a Guy (1951) Fay Oliver
Here Comes the Groom (1951) Orphan (uncredited)
The Bad Seed (1956) Rhoda Penmark
The Snow Queen (1957) Angel, the Robber Girl (voice in 1959 English version)
All Mine to Give (1957) Annabelle Eunson
Kathy O' (1958) Kathy O'Rourke
Peck's Bad Girl (1959) Torey Peck
Wagon Train (season 2, episode 12: "The Mary Ellen Thomas Story"; 1959) Mary Ellen Thomas
Alcoa Presents: One Step Beyond (episode: "Make Me Not a Witch"; 1959) Emmy Horvath
The Adventures of Huckleberry Finn (1960) Joanna Wilkes
Route 66 (season 1, episode 1: "Black November"; 1960) Jan Emerson and Jenny Slade
The Explosive Generation (1961) Janet Sommers
Rawhide (1960) Julie
Jacktown (1962) Margaret
The New Breed (1962) Karen Kegler
Maryjane (1968) Susan Hoffman
The Mini-Skirt Mob (1968) Edie
The Young Runaways (1968) Deanie Donford
Bug (1975) Sylvia Ross
The Ropers (1979-1980) Anne Brookes (as Patricia McCormack)
Magnum, P.I. (1982) Carol Baldwin
Invitation to Hell (1984) Mary Peterson
Saturday the 14th Strikes Back (1988) Kate Baxter
Murder, She Wrote (1987) (Episode: "No Accounting for Murder") Lana Whitman
Murder, She Wrote (1988) (Episode: "Wearing of the Green") Det. Kathleen Chadwick
Mommy (1995) Mommy
Mommy's Day (1997) (aka Mommy 2: Mommy's Day) Mrs. Sterling
The Sopranos (2000-2006) Liz La Cerva
Acceptable Risk (2001) Lois
The Kiss (2003) Priscilla Standhope
Target (2004) Maysie
Shallow Ground (2004) Helen Reedy
 Mystery Woman (2004) Barbara Somers "Snapshot"
Cold Case (2004) (Episode: "Greed") Mavis Breen
Gone, But Not Forgotten (2004) Andrea Hammerhill
Heart of the Beholder (2005) Helen
Criminal Minds (2005) - Marcia Gordon
Frost/Nixon (2008) Pat Nixon
Private Practice (2009) Cynthia
Desperate Housewives (2010) Teresa Pruitt
Supernatural (2012) Eleanor Holmes and Betsy
The Master (2012) Mildred Drummond
Scandal (2012) Anne Pierce
Hart of Dixie (2013) Sylvie Stephens-Wilkes
The Bad Seed (2018) Dr. March
Home Abduction (Lifetime) (2018) Sylvia Holmes
Cookie Run: Kingdom (2021) Dark Enchantress Cookie
The Bad Seed Returns (2022) Dr. March

Radio appearances

See also 
 List of oldest and youngest Academy Award winners and nominees

References

Further reading
 Rigdon, Walter (ed.) The Biographical Encyclopedia of Who's Who of the American Theatre. New York: James H. Heineman, Inc. c1966.
 Best, Marc. Those Endearing Young Charms: Child Performers of the Screen, South Brunswick and New York: Barnes & Co., 1971, pp. 171–175.
 Dye, David. Child and Youth Actors: Filmography of Their Entire Careers, 1914-1985. Jefferson, NC: McFarland & Co., pp. 138–139.
 "Patty McCormack." Biography Resource Center. Thomson Gale. February 15, 2005.

External links

Patty McCormack at the American Film Institute Catalog
Interview, July 19, 2014, Ames Tribune

20th-century American actresses
21st-century American actresses
Actresses from New York City
American child actresses
American film actresses
American stage actresses
American television actresses
American women singers
Dot Records artists
1945 births
Living people
People from Brooklyn
New Utrecht High School alumni